Minotti Bøhn (14 May 1888 – 6 June 1975) was a Norwegian footballer. He played in one match for the Norway national football team in 1908.

References

External links
 

1888 births
1975 deaths
Norwegian footballers
Norway international footballers
Place of birth missing
Association football forwards